Aegires exeches is a species of sea slug. It is a dorid nudibranch, a shell-less marine gastropod mollusc in the family Aegiridae.

Distribution 
This species was described from Hekili Point, Maui, Hawaii. It has been reported from Japan, Papua New Guinea, the Marshall Islands and the Great Barrier Reef, Australia.

References

Aegiridae
Gastropods described in 2004